Official Knowledge: Democratic Education in a Conservative Age is a book written in 1993 by Michael Apple about the inherent politics of educational practice and policy. Its themes include right-wing cultural hegemony, control of textbook contents, and the role of private business in schools. It has received three editions.

References 

 
 
 
 
 
 
 
 
 
 
 
 
 

1993 non-fiction books
Books about education
Routledge books